Manabendra may refer to

 Manabendra Adhikary, Assamese film producer
 Manabendra Mukhopadhyay, Indian singer and music composer
 Manabendra Shah, Indian politician
 Manabendra Narayan Larma, Bangladeshi politician
 Manabendra Nath Roy, Indian revolutionary
 Manabendra Sharma Girls' College, Women's college at Rangia, in Kamrup district, Assam

Indian masculine given names